Coleophora halocnemi is a moth of the family Coleophoridae. It is found in the lower Volga area of southern Russia and central Asia. It occurs in desert-steppe and desert biotopes.

Adults are on wing from late May to June.

The larvae feed on Halocnemum strobilaceum. They feed on the carpels of their host plant.

References

halocnemi
Moths described in 1994
Moths of Europe
Moths of Asia